Celestino Mukavhi (born September 27, 1972) is a Zimbabwean sculptor.

A native of the Bikita area of Masvingo province, Masvingo was last-born in a family of nine.  His parents were subsistence farmers with little education.  In 1975, his mother was killed in crossfire during the war for liberation.  Mukhavi grew up on communal lands, leaving school in 1987 to begin work as a farmer.  In 1989 his father was murdered, and he was forced to move to Harare in search of better work.  Homeless for a time, he was sleeping near the road to Chapungu when he was discovered by Boira Mteki, who invited him to study the art of stonecarving.  Masvingo did, assisting him for six months.  He has also worked with Agnes Nyanhong, Arthur Fata, Cosmas Muchenje, and Garrison Machinjili.  His work won recognition at the 1992 Zimbabwe Roots exhibition; in 1993 he became an artist in residence at the Chapungu Sculpture Park.

He is currently based in Zimbabwe and he continues to make master piece after master piece. Mukavhi likes family and is a peace loving man. These are themes one would find in his sculpture works. He travels to German from time to time where there is a market for his sculptors.

References
Biographical sketch

1972 births
Living people
20th-century Zimbabwean sculptors
21st-century Zimbabwean sculptors